Schwarzsee (Kitzbühel) is a moor lake in Tyrol, Austria.

Lakes of Tyrol (state)
Kitzbühel